Cancilla turneri is a species of sea snail, a marine gastropod mollusk in the family Mitridae, the miters or miter snails.

Description
The length of the shell varies between 20 mm and 50 mm.

Distribution
This marine species occurs off the Philippines

References

 Poppe, G., Tagaro, S. & Salisbury, R., (2009). New species of Mitridae and Costellariidae from the Philippines with additional information on the Philippines species in these families. Visaya: 1-86, sér. supplement 4
 Salisbury R. & Huang S.-I. (2015). Notes on Cancilla isabella (Swainson, 1831) (Neogastropoda: Mitridae) with emphasis on the radula and generic assignment within Mitridae. Visaya. 4(4): 29-41.

External links
 Gastropods.com: Subcancilla turneri

Mitridae
Gastropods described in 2009